The Comarna is a right tributary of the river Jijia in eastern Romania. It discharges into the Jijia near Costuleni.

References

Rivers of Romania
Rivers of Iași County